Askerton is a civil parish in the City of Carlisle district of Cumbria, England.  It has a population of 162 according to the 2001 census, decreasing to 141 at the 2011 Census.  It includes various hamlets including Kirkcambeck and Shopford.  It also covers Side Fell and Askerton Castle.

The parish was originally a township of Lanercost parish.

Etymology
The name probably means 'Ásgeirr's tūn.' 'Ásgeirr' is a Scandinavian personal name, while tūn is Old English for 'farmstead, estate' or, if the place prospered, 'village'. So, 'the estate of Ásgeirr'.

See also

Listed buildings in Askerton

References

External links

  Cumbria County History Trust: Askerton (nb: provisional research only - see Talk page)

City of Carlisle
Civil parishes in Cumbria